is a passenger railway station in located in the city of Izumisano, Osaka Prefecture, Japan, operated by West Japan Railway Company (JR West).

Lines

Station layout
The station consists of one island platform connected to the station building by a footbridge. The station is unattended.

Platforms

History
Nagataki Station opened on 16 June 1930. With the privatization of the Japan National Railways (JNR) on 1 April 1987, the station came under the aegis of the West Japan Railway Company.

Station numbering was introduced in March 2018 with Nagataki being assigned station number JR-R46.

Passenger statistics
In fiscal 2019, the station was used by an average of 942 passengers daily (boarding passengers only).

Surrounding Area
 Izumisano City Haruka Kindergarten
Aritoshi Shrine
Ogami Shrine

See also
List of railway stations in Japan

References

External links

 Nagataki Station Official Site

Railway stations in Osaka Prefecture
Railway stations in Japan opened in 1930
Izumisano